The Molecap Greensand is a Late Cretaceous geologic formation, located in the state of Western Australia in Australia.

A proximal pedal phalanx from an indeterminate theropod has been recovered from the formation, alongside a jaw fragment of a pterosaur, possibly an ornithocheirid. Fossils of a mosasaur, cf. Platecarpus sp. were also reported from the formation.

See also 
 
 List of dinosaur-bearing rock formations
 List of stratigraphic units with indeterminate dinosaur fossils
 South Polar region of the Cretaceous

References 

Geologic formations of Australia
Cretaceous System of Australia
Cenomanian Stage
Turonian Stage
Santonian Stage
Sandstone formations
Shallow marine deposits
Cretaceous paleontological sites of Australia
Fossiliferous stratigraphic units of Oceania
Paleontology in Australia
Geology of Western Australia